"Shine" is the second single taken from English pop group Take That's comeback album, Beautiful World (2006). It became Take That's sixth consecutive number one single and their tenth number-one overall, making them one of only seven acts in the history of the UK charts to have more than nine number one hits. The song is about former Take That member Robbie Williams' battle with depression.

Background and release
The song is written in the key signature of E flat major; however, on some live versions it is performed in D major. It later emerged that Robbie Williams was the subject of the track, written and released prior to his decision to return to the band. The version of "Shine" performed during the band's Beautiful World Tour in 2007 featured an intro that was taken from the finale to the song "Mr. Blue Sky" by the British pop rock group Electric Light Orchestra—this was also done on the group's subsequent The Circus Tour in 2009 and Progress Live Tour in 2011.

"Shine" was released on 26 February 2007 and features lead vocals by Mark Owen. A 'live' version was recorded at a session with BBC Radio 2, and appears on the CD singles of "I'd Wait for Life" and "Reach Out". The song went on to win the British single of the year award at the 2008 BRIT Awards making it Take That's seventh Brit Award.

Critical reception

Sharon Mawer from AllMusic described the song as "a masterpiece of 21st century pop". The BBC noted the song as "a brilliant Beatlesesque, funky pop song". Digital Spy rated the song 5/5 commenting on the musical development of the band, labelling the tune "exciting" and a "really great, fun track".

Commercial performance
The single entered the UK Singles Chart at number 83, and made its official debut to the charts at number 30 the following week, three weeks before its physical release. It reached number one on 4 March 2007, staying two weeks at the top. The single peaked at number two on the download chart. During its first week at the top of the UK Singles Chart, the single rose from number 20 to 2 on the Irish Singles Chart. 

The single has been certified Platinum in the UK for sales over 600,000, and was the second most played/used song of the 2000s in the UK, as reported by UK music licensing body PPL.

Music video
The video for "Shine" was directed by Justin Dickel with a concept of recreating a Busby Berkeley style musical number. While Gary Barlow sits at the piano, the other three members perform most of the song on a lavish staircase. A dozen women dressed in gold dance in the background. It premiered on Channel 4 on Thursday 25 January 2007 at 11:05 p.m.

Samplings
The song is sampled in Lily Allen's 2009 song "Who'd Have Known", which in turn is sampled in T-Pain's 2011 single "5 O'Clock".

Track listings

UK CD single
 "Shine" (radio mix) – 3:29
 "Trouble with Me" – 3:23

German CD single
 "Shine" – 3:29
 "Trouble with Me" – 3:23
 "Patience" (stripped down version) – 3:19
 "Shine" (video) – 3:29

Dutch CD single
 "Shine" – 3:29
 "Trouble with Me" – 3:23
 "Patience" (stripped down version) – 3:19
 "Patience" (Live In Goede Tijden, Slechte Tijden - video) – 3:29

Belgian CD single
 "Shine" – 3:29
 "We Love to Entertain You" – 4:11

Personnel
 Mark Owen – lead vocals
 Gary Barlow – backing vocals
 Howard Donald – backing vocals
 Jason Orange – backing vocals

Charts

Weekly charts

Year-end charts

Certifications

In popular culture
The song was featured in several commercials for the Morrisons supermarkets in the UK, fronted by actress Denise van Outen, comedian Nick Hancock, television presenter Gabby Logan, gardener Diarmuid Gavin, singer Lulu, and television presenter Richard Hammond. According to a PRS-published list of songs used in TV and radio advertisements, it was the 7th most played song for the year 2012.

It was then brought back in an instrumental form in 2013 as part of Morrisons' 'More of what Matters' campaign.

It has also been used by Gala Bingo to mark the start of their bingo sessions, in club, between 2008 and 2014.

It has been used on an episode of Doctor Who Confidential in 2007.
 
The song was used in an episode of Inside No. 9 entitled Cold Comfort.

The song has been used in Furniture Village adverts since 2020.

References

2006 songs
2007 singles
Brit Award for British Single
Number-one singles in Scotland
UK Singles Chart number-one singles
Song recordings produced by John Shanks
Take That songs
Songs written by Mark Owen
Songs written by Gary Barlow
Songs written by Jason Orange
Songs written by Steve Robson
Songs written by Howard Donald
Polydor Records singles